Forrest Leonard Petz (born September 22, 1975) is a retired American mixed martial artist. A professional from 2002 until 2013, he is perhaps best known for his two stints in the UFC, but also fought for King of the Cage and Adrenaline MMA.

Background
Petz was born and raised in Cleveland, Ohio. He attended and graduated from the Cleveland School of Science High School, and worked as a bouncer before becoming a professional fighter.

Mixed martial arts career

Ultimate Fighting Championship
Petz made his UFC debut at Ultimate Fight Night 6 against Sammy Morgan. He won via unanimous decision with one of the judges scoring the fight 30-23 including one of the only 10-7 rounds in UFC history. This is the most lopsided scorecard for a three-round fight in UFC history. Petz's 5 knockdowns of Morgan are also a UFC record.

He lost his next two bouts to Marcus Davis and Kuniyoshi Hironaka before rebounding with a win over Luigi Fioravanti. After losing his next fight against Josh Burkman, Petz was released from the organization with a 2–3 record.

Return to UFC
Petz was re-signed with the UFC, stepping in as a late replacement to fight Daniel Roberts on July 3, 2010, at UFC 116. He lost the fight via split decision.

Petz then faced Brian Foster on September 15, 2010, at UFC Fight Night 22. He lost the fight via TKO in the first round. Following the loss he was once again released by the UFC.

Score Fighting Series
After winning three fights following his release from the UFC, Petz joined the Score Fighting Series. In his first bout with SFS, he won the night's Fight of the Night with a TKO win over Sergey Juskevic.

After winning his SFS debut, Petz again fought for the Score Fighting Series in Hamilton, Ontario on November 23, 2012. He faced Canadian prospect Jordan Mein in the main event. He lost via TKO early in the first round.

Championships and accomplishments
North American Allied Fight Series
NAAFS Welterweight Championship (One time)
Fight Fest MMA
Fight Fest Welterweight Champion (One time)

Mixed martial arts record

|-
| Win
| align=center| 26–10
| Chris Curtis
| Decision (unanimous)
| NAAFS: Fight Night in the Flats 9
| 
| align=center| 3
| align=center| 5:00
| Cleveland, Ohio, United States	
|Middleweight bout.
|-
| Loss
| align=center| 25–10
| Jordan Mein
| TKO (knees and elbows)
| Score Fighting Series 7
| 
| align=center| 1
| align=center| 1:29
| Hamilton, Ontario, Canada
| 
|-
| Win
| align=center| 25–9
| Sergej Juskevic
| TKO (punches)
| Score Fighting Series 4
| 
| align=center| 2
| align=center| 3:25
| Hamilton, Ontario, Canada
| 
|-
| Win
| align=center| 24–9
| Rudy Bears
| TKO (punches)
| C3 Fights: Great Plains Sizzling Slamfest
| 
| align=center| 1
| align=center| 2:55
| Newkirk, Oklahoma, United States
| 
|-
| Win
| align=center| 23–9
| John Kolosci
| TKO (punches)
| HFC 7: Validation
| 
| align=center| 2
| align=center| 0:56
| Valparaiso, Indiana, United States
| 
|-
| Win
| align=center| 22–9
| Herbert Goodman
| Decision (unanimous)
| Ultimate Cage Battle: Pride & Glory
| 
| align=center| 3
| align=center| 5:00
| Parma, Ohio, United States
|Middleweight bout.
|-
| Loss
| align=center| 21–9
| Brian Foster
| TKO (punches)
| UFC Fight Night: Marquardt vs. Palhares
| 
| align=center| 1
| align=center| 1:07
| Austin, Texas, United States
| 
|-
| Loss
| align=center| 21–8
| Daniel Roberts
| Decision (split)
| UFC 116
| 
| align=center| 3
| align=center| 5:00
| Las Vegas, Nevada, United States
| 
|-
| Win
| align=center| 21–7
| Ralph Johnson
| Decision (unanimous)
| Moosin: God of Martial Arts
| 
| align=center| 3
| align=center| 5:00
| Worcester, Massachusetts, United States
| 
|-
| Win
| align=center| 20–7
| Brendan Seguin
| Decision (unanimous)
| NAAFS: Night of Champions
| 
| align=center| 5
| align=center| 5:00
| Akron, Ohio, United States
| 
|-
| Win
| align=center| 19–7
| Chad Reiner
| TKO (punches)
| Adrenaline MMA 4: Sylvia vs. Riley
| 
| align=center| 1
| align=center| 2:28
| Council Bluffs, Iowa, United States
| 
|-
| Win
| align=center| 18–7
| Tiawan Howard
| TKO (punches)
| NAAFS: Fight Nite in the Flats 5
| 
| align=center| 3
| align=center| 3:01
| Cleveland, Ohio, United States
| 
|-
| Loss
| align=center| 17–7
| Victor O'Donnell
| Submission (rear-naked choke)
| ICF: Breakout
| 
| align=center| 2
| align=center| 4:46
| Cincinnati, Ohio, United States
| 
|-
| Loss
| align=center| 17–6
| T. J. Grant
| Submission (arm-triangle choke)
| TKO 35: Quenneville vs. Hioki
| 
| align=center| 2
| align=center| 3:55
| Montreal, Quebec, Canada
| 
|-
| Win
| align=center| 17–5
| Brian Gassaway
| Decision (unanimous)
| Adrenaline MMA: Guida vs Russow
| 
| align=center| 3
| align=center| 5:00
| Chicago, Illinois, United States
| 
|-
| Loss
| align=center| 16–5
| Josh Burkman
| Decision (split)
| UFC 77
| 
| align=center| 3
| align=center| 5:00
| Cincinnati, Ohio, United States
| 
|-
| Win
| align=center| 16–4
| Luigi Fioravanti
| Decision (unanimous)
| UFC Fight Night 10
| 
| align=center| 3
| align=center| 5:00
| Hollywood, Florida, United States
| 
|-
| Loss
| align=center| 15–4
| Kuniyoshi Hironaka
| Decision (unanimous)
| UFC Fight Night: Stevenson vs. Guillard
| 
| align=center| 3
| align=center| 5:00
| Las Vegas, Nevada, United States
| 
|-
| Loss
| align=center| 15–3
| Marcus Davis
| Submission (guillotine choke)
| Ortiz vs. Shamrock 3: The Final Chapter
| 
| align=center| 1
| align=center| 4:58
| Hollywood, Florida, United States
| 
|-
| Win
| align=center| 15–2
| Sammy Morgan
| Decision (unanimous)
| UFC Fight Night 6
| 
| align=center| 3
| align=center| 5:00
| Las Vegas, Nevada, United States
| 
|-
| Win
| align=center| 14–2
| Dan Hardy
| Decision (unanimous)
| FF 2: Fightfest 2
| 
| align=center| 5
| align=center| 5:00
| Canton, Ohio, United States
| 
|-
| Win
| align=center| 13–2
| Daniel Moraes
| TKO (retirement)
| GFC: Team Gracie vs. Team Hammer House
| 
| align=center| 3
| align=center| 2:33
| Columbus, Ohio, United States
| 
|-
| Win
| align=center| 12–2
| Wayne Hajicek
| Submission (rear-naked choke)
| FF 1: Royce Gracie Fightfest
| 
| align=center| 1
| align=center| 0:35
| Evansville, Indiana, United States
| 
|-
| Loss
| align=center| 11–2
| Josh Neer
| Submission (triangle choke)
| FFC 15: Fiesta Las Vegas
| 
| align=center| 1
| align=center| 3:25
| Las Vegas, Nevada, United States
| 
|-
| Win
| align=center| 11–1
| Charles Bennett
| Submission (arm-triangle choke)
| KOTC 48: Payback
| 
| align=center| 1
| align=center| 3:40
| Cleveland, Ohio, United States
|Welterweight debut.
|-
| Win
| align=center| 10–1
| Rhomez Brower
| KO (punches)
| KOTC 45: King of the Cage 45
| 
| align=center| 1
| align=center| N/A
| Indiana, United States
| 
|-
| Loss
| align=center| 9–1
| Jake Short
| Decision (unanimous)
| FFC 12: Freestyle Fighting Championships 12
| 
| align=center| 3
| align=center| N/A
| Indiana, United States
| 
|-
| Win
| align=center| 9–0
| Adrian Serrano
| Submission (verbal)
| FCC 15: Freestyle Combat Challenge 15
| 
| align=center| 2
| align=center| 2:06
| Racine, Wisconsin, United States
| 
|-
| Win
| align=center| 8–0
| Mike O'Donnell
| TKO (punches)
| KOTC 34: Ohio
| 
| align=center| 1
| align=center| N/A
| Canton, Ohio, United States
| 
|-
| Win
| align=center| 7–0
| Leo Sylvest
| TKO (punches)
| ACC 1: Absolute Combat Challenge 1
| 
| align=center| 2
| align=center| 0:14
| Canton, Ohio, United States
| 
|-
| Win
| align=center| 6–0
| Joe Thomas
| KO (punch)
| ACC 1: Absolute Combat Challenge 1
| 
| align=center| 2
| align=center| 0:09
| Canton, Ohio, United States
| 
|-
| Win
| align=center| 5–0
| Chris Wells
| Decision (unanimous) 
| Midevils Mayhem 1
| 
| align=center| 2
| align=center| 5:00
| Newport, Kentucky, United States
| 
|-
| Win
| align=center| 4–0
| Tierre Hall
| Submission
| HHFN: Hammer House Fight Night
| 
| align=center| 1
| align=center| N/A
| Cleveland, Ohio, United States
| 
|-
| Win
| align=center| 3–0
| Daniel McRae
| TKO (punches)
| Rage on the River 1
| 
| align=center| 1
| align=center| 3:42
| Portsmouth, Ohio, United States
| 
|-
| Win
| align=center| 2–0
| Ed Willis
| TKO (submission to punches)
| ETC: July 2002
| 
| align=center| 1
| align=center| 0:47
| Mt. Healthy, Ohio, United States
| 
|-
| Win
| align=center| 1–0
| Chad Roarke
| TKO (punches) 
| Dangerzone: Fight Night 2
| 
| align=center| 1
| align=center| 1:44
| Fort Wayne, Indiana, United States
|

References

External links
 
 

Living people
1975 births
Forrest Petz
Welterweight mixed martial artists
Sportspeople from Cleveland
Mixed martial artists from Ohio
Ultimate Fighting Championship male fighters